Wuyuntana , known in Japan as , is a Mongolian singer from the Horqin district of Tongliao, Inner Mongolia, China. She has been living in Japan since 1987 and has contributed vocals to a variety of anime including Macross Plus, Shamanic Princess, Betterman and the first Cardcaptor Sakura movie.

Albums
 Khorchin (ホルチン, 1998)
 Ten no Kabe (天の壁, 2001)

21st-century Mongolian women singers
20th-century Mongolian women singers
Living people
Anime musicians
Year of birth missing (living people)